Mitchell Cole Wilcox (born July 14, 1999) is an American professional baseball pitcher in the Tampa Bay Rays organization.

Amateur career
Wilcox attended Heritage High School in Ringgold, Georgia, where he played baseball, basketball, and football. He committed to play college baseball at the University of Georgia as a freshman. In 2018, his senior year, he went 9–2 with a 1.59 ERA, striking out 95 batters over  innings. He was drafted by the Washington Nationals in the 37th round of the 2018 Major League Baseball draft, but did not sign and instead chose to fulfill his college commitment.

In 2019, Wilcox's freshman year at Georgia, he appeared in 19 games (six starts) in which he went 3–2 with a 4.07 ERA, striking out 64 over  innings. He specifically excelled during SEC play, compiling a 2.29 ERA and a .184 batting average against over  innings pitched during conference play. He was named to the All-SEC Freshman Team. That summer, he played for the USA Baseball Collegiate National Team, and also played briefly for the Orleans Firebirds of the Cape Cod Baseball League. Wilcox compiled a 3–0 record and a 1.57 ERA over four starts in 2020 before the college baseball season was cut short due to the COVID-19 pandemic.

Professional career

San Diego Padres organization
Wilcox was considered a top prospect for the 2020 Major League Baseball draft. He was selected by the San Diego Padres in the third round with the 80th overall selection. He signed with the Padres on June 30 for a $3.3 million signing bonus, a record among players drafted in the third round. He did not play a minor league game in 2020 due to the cancellation of the minor league season caused by the pandemic.

Tampa Bay Rays organization
On December 29, 2020, Wilcox, along with Luis Patiño, Blake Hunt, and Francisco Mejía, were traded to the Tampa Bay Rays in exchange for pitcher Blake Snell. To begin the 2021 season, he was assigned to the Charleston RiverDogs of the Low-A East. He was placed on the 10-day injured list with an elbow strain on July 19, and transferred to the 60-day injured list on August 9, effectively ending his season. Over ten starts prior to the injury, Wilcox was 1-0 with a 2.03 ERA, striking out 52 batters over  innings. He underwent Tommy John surgery in early September.

Wilcox was activated off the injured list in early August 2022 and made seven appearances between the Rookie-level Florida Complex League Rays and Charleston. Over seven starts between the two teams, he went 0-2 with a 3.94 ERA and 24 strikeouts over 16 innings.

References

External links

Georgia Bulldogs bio

1999 births
Living people
Baseball players from Georgia (U.S. state)
Baseball pitchers
Georgia Bulldogs baseball players
Orleans Firebirds players
United States national baseball team players
Charleston RiverDogs players